Albaha University is a university in Al Baha city, the capital of Al Baha province, Saudi Arabia. It is a public university that was founded in 2006. The president of the university is Prof. Dr. Abdullah Alhussain. The main campus is at Alaqiq about 25 km away from Al Baha city. The other campuses are in Almikhwah, Almandaq, and Baljurashi. The land of the main campus in Alaqiq occupies about 6.7 km2. The university emphasizes public services  in all of its disciplines. A new organization project at the university was named a lighting platform that was established by students. The idea of the platform is to spread the support of university students and for all levels as well.

Faculties
Al Baha university consists of 11 faculties:

The faculty of Medicine
The faculty of clinical pharmacy 
The faculty of Engineering
The faculty of Applied Medical Sciences
The faculty of Administrative and financial sciences
The faculty of Science
The faculty of Education
The faculty of Arts and Humanities
College of Science and Arts in Almikhwah
College of Science and Arts in Almandaq
College of Science and Arts in Baljurashi
Community College

Departments

Faculty of Medicine
Faculty of Science
Physics Department
Chemistry Department
Mathematics Department
Biological Sciences Department
Computer Science Department
Information System (IS) Department
Faculty of Engineering:
Mechanical Engineering Department
Civil Engineering Department
Electrical Engineering Department
Architecture Department
Computer Engineering Department
Faculty of Education
Special Education Needs Department
Fine arts Department
Physical Education Department
Curriculum and Teaching Methodology Department
Teaching Technology Department
Psychology and Education Department
Educational Planning and Administration Department
Faculty of Applied medical sciences
Medical Laboratory Department
Community Health Department
Dental Health Department
Nursing Department
Optometry Department
Physiotherapy Department
Radiology Department
Clinical Technology Department
Faculty of Arts and Humanities
Foreign Languages Department
Arabic Language Department
Islamic Studies Department
Faculty of Administrative and Financial Sciences
Business Administration Department
Accountancy Department
Information Technology Administration Department
Marketing Department
Banking and Financial Sciences Department
Health Administration Department
Law Department
Community College

In addition there are three other campuses:

College of Arts and Science in Baljurashi
College of Arts and Science in Al-Mandaq
College of Arts and Science in Almikhwah

External links 
 Albaha University website

2006 establishments in Saudi Arabia
Baha
Educational institutions established in 2006